Weriton Luiz Gutierre, commonly known as Weriton (born 28 February 1992) is a Brazilian footballer who plays as a winger.

Club career

Senica
He made his professional debut against MFK Ružomberok on 10 September 2016.

References

External links
 FK Senica official club profile 
 Weriton profile at Soccerpunter 
 
 Weriton profile at Futbalnet 
 #player Weriton profile at N3Sports

1992 births
Living people
Brazilian footballers
Brazilian expatriate footballers
Association football defenders
Campeonato Brasileiro Série C players
Campeonato Brasileiro Série D players
Slovak Super Liga players
Associação Desportiva Recreativa e Cultural Icasa players
Associação Desportiva Bahia de Feira players
Grêmio Barueri Futebol players
Maranhão Atlético Clube players
Ferroviário Atlético Clube (CE) players
União Agrícola Barbarense Futebol Clube players
Esporte Clube Internacional de Lages players
Clube Atlético Tubarão players
FK Senica players
FK Spišská Nová Ves players
Cuiabá Esporte Clube players
Iraty Sport Club players
Cianorte Futebol Clube players
Mirassol Futebol Clube players
Footballers from São Paulo (state)
Brazilian expatriate sportspeople in Slovakia
Expatriate footballers in Slovakia